Sir Ivan Neill, KBE, PC (1 July 1906 — 7 November 2001), was a British Army officer and Unionist politician from Northern Ireland.

Early life
Born in Belfast, Ireland, Neill studied at Ravenscroft National School and Shaftesbury Tutorial College before receiving a BSc in Economics from Queen's University, Belfast.  He ran a firm of building contractors in east Belfast before joining the Royal Engineers as an officer in 1939.  He served with the military until 1946, by which time he held the rank of major.

Political activity
In 1946, Neill was elected to Belfast Corporation as an Ulster Unionist Party member, and two years later, he became an alderman, serving until 1950.  At the 1949 Northern Ireland general election, he was elected for Belfast Ballynafeigh. In January 1950, he was made Minister of Labour, and was appointed to the Privy Council of Northern Ireland.  In this post, he sometimes spoke against his Government's policy – for example, against the 1956 Rent Bill which permitted landlords to increase rents in order to improve properties, while in 1958 he was rebuked for making a critical speech on economic policy.

He held the post until 1962, when he became Minister of Education, then in 1964 he moved to become Minister of Finance and Leader of the House of Commons.  He was stripped of the Leadership of the House the following spring, and resigned from the Government in April, feeling that he was being marginalised in favour of William Craig.

In 1964, Neill again took a seat as an alderman on Belfast Corporation, this time serving for six years. In December 1968, he returned to the Government as Minister of Development, then in March 1969, he was elected as the Speaker of the House of Commons.

The Official Irish Republican Army attempted to kidnap Neill from his house near Rostrevor, in October 1971.  They were unsuccessful, but in December, his house was burnt down in an arson attack.

The Parliament was prorogued in 1972. In March 1973, the British Government published its plans to replace the Parliament with the Northern Ireland Assembly. Neill resigned as a Member of Parliament and as Speaker. He was not replaced, and was therefore the last Speaker of the Parliament of Northern Ireland. He received a knighthood and withdrew from politics.

Personal life
Neill was married to Margaret with whom he had no children.

In 1995, Neill wrote an autobiography, Church and State. In this, he called on unionists to put aside their differences.

He was a frequent visitor to his local Baptist Church.

References

1906 births
2001 deaths
Alumni of Queen's University Belfast
Members of Belfast City Council
Members of the House of Commons of Northern Ireland 1949–1953
Members of the House of Commons of Northern Ireland 1953–1958
Members of the House of Commons of Northern Ireland 1958–1962
Members of the House of Commons of Northern Ireland 1962–1965
Members of the House of Commons of Northern Ireland 1965–1969
Members of the House of Commons of Northern Ireland 1969–1973
Members of the Privy Council of Northern Ireland
Royal Engineers officers
Ulster Unionist Party members of the House of Commons of Northern Ireland
Northern Ireland Cabinet ministers (Parliament of Northern Ireland)
British Army personnel of World War II
Ministers of Finance of Northern Ireland
Speakers of the House of Commons of Northern Ireland
Members of the House of Commons of Northern Ireland for Belfast constituencies